Zenon or Zeno (3rd century BC), son of Agreophon, was a public official in Ptolemaic Egypt around the 250s-230s BC. His writings are known from a cache of papyrus documents which was discovered by archaeologists in the Nile Valley in 1914.

Biography
Zeno was a native of the Greek town of Kaunos in Caria in southwestern Asia Minor. He moved to the town of Philadelphia in Egypt, a busy market town that had been founded on the edge of the Faiyum by Ptolemy II Philadelphus in honour of his sister Arsinoe II. From the 3rd century BC until the 5th century CE, Philadelphia was a thriving settlement that relied on agriculture for its economic success. At Philadelphia, Zeno became a private secretary to Apollonius, the finance minister to Ptolemy II Philadelphus and Ptolemy III Euergetes.

Drimylus and Dionysius, two Greek employees under Zeno, were reported to him for selling women as sex-slaves.

The Zenon Papyri

During the winter of 1914–1915, Egyptian agricultural labourers were digging near the modern settlement of Kom el-Kharaba for sebakh (decayed mudbricks that were often plundered from ancient sites as they could be used as fertiliser). There, they uncovered a cache of over 2,000 papyrus documents. Upon examination by Egyptology scholars, these documents were found to be records written by Zeno in Greek and Demotic, and the site (whose precise location is now unknown) was identified as the location of the ancient town of Philadelphia. Most of the papyri, now referred to as the Zenon Archive or the Zenon Papyri, were edited and published by the British papyrologists Campbell Cowan Edgar and Arthur Surridge Hunt.

The Zenon Archive has since been divided among several museum collections and academic institutions around the world, and papyri are now held in the collections of the University of Michigan, Columbia University, the Società Italiana per la Ricerca dei Papiri Greci e Latini in Egitto, the British Museum in London and the Egyptian Museum in Cairo. A substantial part of the Zenon Papyri are now online and grammatically tagged at the Perseus Project hosted at Tufts University.

References

Sources

External links
 Letters from the Zenon Archive in English translation
 Accounting in the Zenon Papyri (1932), by Elizabeth Grier (JSTOR)

Ancient Greeks in Egypt
Ancient Greeks in Caria
Ptolemaic officials
Greek-language papyri
3rd-century BC Greek people